As of October 2015, there were more than 60 registered oil companies in Kenya.

History 
The history of oil marketing in Kenya began in 1904 during colonial times. Initially, kerosene was the main import in tins but later gasoline was imported in tins and drums. Royal Dutch Shell established the first depot at Shimanzi, in Mombasa, in the early 1900s.

Today 
On 26 August 2019 Kenyan President Uhuru Kenyatta flagged off the first consignment of 200,000 barrels for export as the East African nation to joins the league of petroleum exporting countries. The first consignment of Kenyan crude oil which left the Port of Mombasa for Britain, makes Kenya the first eastern Africa country to become an oil exporting nation, said Kenyatta at a ceremony in the coastal city.

As of July 2018, there were over 60 registered oil companies in Kenya. The industry was controlled by major companies such as Libya Oil Kenya Limited, Vivo Energy Kenya Limited and TotalEnergies with competition from some locally established companies such as KenolKobil, National Corporation, Tosha and Dalbit Petroleum. At that time, the shareholding among the oil marketing companies in Kenya, were as illustrated in the table below:

As of April 2022, the shareholding among the oil majors in Kenya was as illustrated in the table below:

See also
 Energy in Kenya
 Petroleum industry in Kenya

References

External links
 Kenya seals deal for cheaper Saudi fuel As of 28 June 2022.